Clover is a 2020 American crime comedy thriller film directed by Jon Abrahams and starring Mark Webber, Nicole Elizabeth Berger, Ron Perlman, Chazz Palminteri and Abrahams.

Cast

JJ Alfieri

Release
The film was released on demand and digital on April 3, 2020.

Reception
The film has  rating on Rotten Tomatoes.  Enrique Acosta of Film Threat gave the film a 1 out of 10.  Simon Abrams of RogerEbert.com awarded the film two and a half stars.  Kate Erbland of IndieWire graded the film a C.

Dennis Harvey of Variety gave the film a negative review and wrote, "...this violent caper lacks any real wit or novelty(...), ultimately leaning on tired stereotypes rather than doing anything particularly clever with them."

Frank Scheck of The Hollywood Reporter also gave the film a negative review and wrote, "...it never manages to overcome its air of overfamiliarity, straining mightily but giving off little but flop sweat."

References

External links
 
 

American comedy thriller films
American crime comedy films
American crime thriller films
2020s English-language films
2020s American films